Callum Beattie is a Scottish singer-songwriter signed to 3 Beat Records. He has released six singles, two EPs and his debut album People Like Us was released in May 2020.

Career
Beattie released his first single "We Are Stars" in 2017. In 2019, he uploaded the anti-Brexit and Conservative Party song "Boris Song" onto YouTube, becoming viral.
His debut album People Like Us was released in 2020, reaching number 18 on the UK Albums Chart's mid-week chart according to Official Charts Company, and eventually debuting at number 68 with sales of 1,449 units.  In May 2020 Beattie was interviewed by Robin Galloway on Pure Radio about his pride in the Scottish sound of the album, saying that his "heart will always lie back home".

On 26 June 2020, Beattie released his first music video for the song "Salamander Street", about a former classmate who became a prostitute in Edinburgh. This music video gained worldwide popularity for the distinctive animation style and immersive colours.

Discography

Albums

Singles

References

Living people
Scottish male singer-songwriters
21st-century Scottish male singers
1991 births
3 Beat Records artists